Avalon Raceway is a dirt track racing venue located in Lara, Victoria, Australia.

History
The track opened in 1976 thanks to the efforts of brothers Doug and Norm Drew, drivers from the area who like others needed a venue to race at after the closure of Torquay Speedway. Early on the big attraction to the new Speedway were the bikes with such Solo riders as World Champions Ole Olsen, Ivan Mauger and Barry Briggs battling Australian riders such as Victorian favourite Phil Crump. Sidecars were also a big draw and the Speedway hosted the 1980 Australian Sidecar Championship as well as numerous Victorian Sidecar title meetings.

The introduction of clay to the track surface in the early 1990s saw bike racing off the program at Avalon Raceway. Sprint car racing had been the biggest draw in Australian speedway since the late 1970s and the clay surface suited this type of oval track racing. Since this time Avalon has been a regular of the World Series Sprintcars and was also the home of the Australian Speedcar Grand Prix from 2003 until 2010.  The WSS date is often an international affair, as the event occurs days after Christmas Day and United States-based drivers often participate during their off-season.  NASCAR stars Christopher Bell and Kyle Larson, World of Outlaws star Brad Sweet, and Knoxville Nationals winner Jason Johnson have participated in sprint car races at this circuit during their off-season.

The outright lap record is held by South Australian driver Steven Lines from Mount Gambier, with a time of 10.930 seconds, set on 12 November 2011, in a 410 Sprintcar.

Lap Records
As of February 2014. All have a 1 lap rolling start.
410 Sprintcars: 0:10.930 – Steven Lines – 12 November 2011
360 Sprintcars: 0:12.54 – M. Reed – 11 January 2014
Speedcars: 0:13:70 – Michael Pickens – 19 March 2005
Formula 500: 0:13.98 – L. Williams – 21 February 2009
Super Sedans: 0:14:90 – Peter Nicola – 1 January 2005
Super Rods: 0:15:48 – L. Podger – 12 March 2005
Wingless Sprints: 0:15.60 – L. Weel – 29 March 2014
GP Midgets: 0:15:83 – D. Meyers – 19 December 2009
V8 Dirt Modifieds: 0:15:93 – L. Hobson – 23 March 1981
National Rods: 0:15.93 – L. Hobson – 23 March 1991
Modified Production: 00:16:01 – J. Drew – 30 March 2007
Street Stocks: 0:18.09 – M. Dann – 1 April 2006

References

External links
Official web site

Buildings and structures in Geelong
Sports venues in Victoria (Australia)
Speedway venues in Australia
1976 establishments in Australia